This is a list of earthquakes in Romania, including any notable historical earthquakes that have epicenters within the current boundaries of Romania, or which caused significant effects in this area.

Seismic hazard
The seismicity of Romania is clustered in several epicentral zones: Vrancea, Făgăraș-Câmpulung, Banat, Crișana, Maramureș, and Southern Dobrogea. Other epicentral zones of local importance can be found in Transylvania, in the area of Jibou and Târnava River, in the northern and western part of Oltenia, in northern Moldova, and the Wallachian Plain. The Vrancea seismogenic zone is the most important among these seismic zones, having in mind the energy, the extent of the macroseismic effects, and the persistent and confined character of the earthquakes that occur in this area. The Vrancea area is responsible for over 90% of all earthquakes in Romania, releasing over 95% of the seismic energy. Two belts of moderate and shallower seismicity are emphasized in the other regions of the country: one along the Southern Carpathians and the eastern edge of the Pannonian Basin, the other along the Eastern Carpathians that extends towards SE on the Peceneaga–Camena line.

During the last 1,000 years, according to historical data, it is thought that 17 earthquakes of 7 and over magnitude have occurred, which suggests a means for unleashing the energy every 58 years. Statistically, the magnitude 6 and over earthquakes in the Vrancea area occur approximately every 10 years, with magnitude 7 every 33 years, while those with 7.5 magnitudes every 80 years.

Earthquakes
Earthquakes listed in the following tables include only M6.0+ events or earthquakes with significant material damage or casualties. All seismic events are shown in detail in the ROMPLUS catalog of the National Institute for Earth Physics. It collected information from the catalog of Constantinescu and Mîrza (1980) for the period 984–1997. After 1997, the catalog was permanently filled and updated with data on seismic events produced in Romania and around national borders.

Gallery

See also
Geology of Romania
List of earthquakes in Vrancea County

References

External links
The National Institute for Research and Development for Earth Physics - NIEP
Adevărul.ro – List of the most powerful earthquakes in Romania
Cutremur.net – List of earthquakes in Romania since 1800
Geodin.ro – Romanian seismology
Realitatea.net – The five strongest earthquakes in Romania in the last 200 years
National Institute for Earth Physics – List of earthquakes in Romania
Seismic map of Bucharest

 
Romania
Earthquakes
Earthquakes